Valley College might refer to:
 Valley College station, a stop on a bus-rapid transit line in Los Angeles
 Los Angeles Valley College, a community college